The 1991–92 season was FC Dinamo București's 43rd season in Divizia A. The year 1992 brings the 14th Divizia A title in history. Dinamo dominated the season from start to finish and ended without a single loss. The newcomers Gábor Gerstenmájer and Albanian Sulejman Demollari made an instant impact, scoring together 39 goals in league only. The technical staff was formed from Florin Halagian – head coach, Viorel Hizo and Florin Cheran – assistants, and Dutch Rinus Israel – technical director.

In Europe, Dinamo entered the UEFA Cup and in the first round passed by Sporting CP, but was stopped in the second round by another club from Genoa. After Sampdoria, now Genoa C.F.C.

Results

UEFA Cup 

First round

Dinamo București won 2–1 on aggregate.

Second round

Genoa won 5-3 on aggregate.

Squad 

Goalkeepers: Bogdan Stelea (11 / 0); Costel Câmpeanu (1 / 0); Florin Tene (21 / 0); Perlat Musta  (2 / 0).
Defenders: Iulian Mihăescu (27 / 1); Marian Pană (24 / 0); Gheorghe Mihali (30 / 0); Tibor Selymes (27 / 0); Adrian Matei (16 / 0); Tudorel Cristea (13 / 1); Anton Doboș (4 / 0); Marius Răduță (7 / 0).
Midfielders:  Marius Cheregi (28 / 4); Gábor Gerstenmájer (30 / 21); Zoltán Kádár (29 / 1); Costel Pană (29 / 7); Dorinel Munteanu (33 / 12); Sebastian Moga (32 / 4); Cristinel Atomulesei (8 / 0); Marius Priseceanu (4 / 0); George Visalom (1 / 0).
Forwards: Sulejman Demollari  (30 / 18); Daniel Scînteie (7 / 3); Gheorghe Pena (1 / 0); Nelson Mensah  (12 / 2); Cristian Sava (14 / 1).
(league appearances and goals listed in brackets)

Manager: Florin Halagian.

Transfers 

Dinamo brought Sebastian Moga (Gloria Bistriţa), Gheorghe Mihali and Dorinel Munteanu (Inter Sibiu), Zoltan Kadar (U Cluj) and Gábor Gerstenmájer (FC Braşov). Dinamo transferred the first foreign players in the history: the Albanians Sulejman Demollari (Dinamo Tirana) and Perlat Musta (Partizani Tirana) along with Ghanaian Nelson Mensah.

In the summer break Vasile Miriuță was sold to Gloria Bistriţa and Marian Damaschin left for Feyenoord Rotterdam.

In the winter break, Anton Doboş was sold to Steaua, Bogdan Stelea to RCD Mallorca, Costel Câmpeanu to Gloria Bistriţa in exchange for Florin Tene.

See also
List of unbeaten football club seasons

References 

 www.labtof.ro
 www.romaniansoccer.ro

FC Dinamo București seasons
Dinamo Bucuresti
Romanian football championship-winning seasons